The 1904 Yale Bulldogs football team represented Yale University in the 1904 college football season. The Bulldogs finished with a 10–1 record under first-year head coach Charles D. Rafferty.  The team outscored its opponents by a combined 220 to 20 score with the only loss being by an 11–6 score to Army.

Four Yale players (quarterback Foster Rockwell, end Tom Shevlin, tackle James Hogan, and guard Ralph Kinney) were consensus picks for the 1904 College Football All-America Team.

Schedule

References

Yale
Yale Bulldogs football seasons
College football undefeated seasons
Yale Bulldogs football